Pavel Holomek (born 13 April 1972) is a Czech former football player. He played in the Gambrinus liga for Brno, Teplice and Drnovice.

He made his debut for Brno in 1990. He announced his retirement from Czech football after scoring his last league goal in the 2004–05 Gambrinus liga on 25 May 2005.

Honours

Club

 FK Teplice
 Czech Cup: 2003

Personal life
Pavel Holomek's younger brother, Patrik, also played professional football. After his football career, Holomek went on to sell windows.

References

External links
 
 
 Profile at FC Zbrojovka Brno official website 

Czech footballers
Czech First League players
1972 births
Living people
FC Zbrojovka Brno players
FK Drnovice players
FK Teplice players
Footballers from Brno
Association football forwards